Stewartsville is an unincorporated community and census-designated place (CDP) located within Greenwich Township in Warren County, New Jersey, United States, that was created as part of the 2010 United States Census. As of the 2010 Census, the CDP's population was 349.  

The area is served as United States Postal Service ZIP code 08886.

The community of Stewartsville was named after Thomas Stewart, a secretary to George Washington, who purchased property in the area in 1793.

Geography
According to the United States Census Bureau, the CDP had a total area of 0.129 square miles (0.333 km2), all of which was land.

Demographics

Census 2010

Census 2000
As of the 2000 United States Census, the population for ZIP Code Tabulation Area 08886 was 4,854.

Transportation
The area is accessible via exit 4 and exit 3 on Interstate 78.

Points of interest
The nearby Kennedy House and Mill, located on Route 173 in Kennedy Mills, was listed on the National Register of Historic Places in 1996.

The town features two churches, the First Lutheran Church and the Stewartsville Presbyterian Church.

References

External links

Census-designated places in Warren County, New Jersey
Greenwich Township, Warren County, New Jersey